Kings Centre is a provincial electoral district for the Legislative Assembly of New Brunswick, Canada.  It was first contested in the 2014 general election, having been created in the 2013 redistribution of electoral boundaries. It drew most of its population the former districts of Fundy-River Valley and Hampton-Kings, as well as from a small part of Kings East.

The district includes the western and north-central parts of Kings County, including the Kingston Peninsula and Village of Norton, as well as the Town of Grand Bay-Westfield and small parts of Queens and Charlotte Counties to its north and west.

Members of the Legislative Assembly

Election results

References

External links 
Website of the Legislative Assembly of New Brunswick
Map of riding as of 2018

New Brunswick provincial electoral districts